The men's 4 × 100 metre freestyle relay competition of the swimming events at the 2011 Pan American Games took place on 16 October at the Scotiabank Aquatics Center. The defending Pan American Games champion is the Brazil (Fernando Silva, Eduardo Deboni, Nicolas Oliveira and Cesar Cielo).

This race consisted of eight lengths of the pool. Each of the four swimmers completed two lengths of the pool. The first swimmer had to touch the wall before the second could leave the starting block.

Records
Prior to this competition, the existing world and Pan American Games records were as follows:

Results
All times shown are in minutes.

Heats
The first round was held on October 16.
As only eight teams had entered, the heats served as a ranking round with all eight teams advancing to the final.

Final 
The final was held on October 16.

References

Swimming at the 2011 Pan American Games
4 × 100 metre freestyle relay